Richie Rich is an American sitcom series produced by DreamWorks Animation's AwesomenessTV for Netflix. The show is loosely based upon the Harvey Comics character of the same name, with Jake Brennan playing the eponymous character. However, all of the original characters (except for Richie and Irona) were replaced with a new supporting cast. The first season, consisting of 10 episodes, was released on February 20, 2015. A second season of 11 episodes was released on May 22, 2015.

Plot
Richie Rich is a boy who turned vegetables into a clean energy source. As a result; Rich now has over a trillion dollars. Rich lives with his family in a mansion filled with toys, contraptions, and his best friends Darcy and Murray are always by his side, along with Richie's robot maid, Irona, his dad, Cliff; who loves naps and is a bit dense, and his jealous sister, Harper. Also, Darcy loves spending money and Murray doesn't want anything out of budget.

Cast

Main characters
Jake Brennan as Richie Rich, after finding a way to harness energy from uneaten vegetables, he becomes a child trillionaire. Unlike his comic book counterpart, he is not born rich and he was a self-made trillionaire.  
Brooke Wexler as Irona, Richie's robotic maid which he calls her a "super model" model. She will sometimes try to hit on inanimate electronics.
Kiff VandenHeuvel as Cliff Rich, Richie's and Harper's childish father that isn't very smart and likes to eat or take naps.
Lauren Taylor as Harper Rich, Richie's jealous older sister; who wants to get into Harvard. 
Joshua Carlon as Murray, Richie's money manager and best friend; who does not like Darcy taking Richie's money and spending it.
Jenna Ortega as Darcy, Richie's other best friend, who encourages bad habits and spends money from Richie without his knowledge

Recurring characters
Ysa Penarejo as Tulip Steinhoff, a friend of Harper; who is not very bright and is also optimistic. She believes her name comes from having "two lips" not the flower.
Nathan Anderson as Tahj Stokes (nicknames himself "T-Nice") the son of Bulldozer the rapper and a friend of Richie. For unknown reasons, he likes to do Ballet and is attracted to Richie's older sister Harper, he is also always been neglected by other people; who always know him as "Bulldozer's son".
Peter Glennon as Swedish House Sensation (real name Rebecca) once a popular DJ from Sweden, but in more recent times he is Richie's personal meatball chef.

Production
The series was announced in October 2014 as part of an ongoing partnership between Netflix and DreamWorks Animation, in which DreamWorks will create 300 hours of original programming for the service. Unlike the comics, where the lead character comes from a wealthy family, Richie Rich has a self-made fortune from an innovative green technology. The series follows his adventures with his new wealth. Brian Robbins (co-founder and CEO of DreamWorks Animation-owned AwesomenessTV), Tim Pollock and Jeff Hodsden (The Suite Life of Zack & Cody) are the executive producers and showrunners. Additionally, AwesomenessTV's Shauna Phelan and Joe Davola serve as executive producers on the series.

Episodes

Series overview

Season 1 (2015)

Season 2 (2015)

References

External links
 at Netflix

2015 American television series debuts
2015 American television series endings
2010s American teen sitcoms
English-language Netflix original programming
Television shows based on Harvey Comics
Awesomeness (company)
Television series by DreamWorks Animation
Netflix children's programming
Richie Rich (comics)
Television series about children